Pano Pyrgos, is a village in Cyprus. It is controlled by the Republic of Cyprus. Due to its location, being surrounded by the Trodos Mountains, the Turkish controlled exclave of Kokkina, and the Green Line, it is rather isolated and difficult to reach and gets significant numbers of visitors only in August during summer vacation.

References

External links
Awarded "EDEN - European Destinations of Excellence" non traditional tourist destination 2010

Communities in Nicosia District